Badminton competitions at the Beijing 2008 Summer Olympics were held from 9 August to 17 August at the Beijing University of Technology Gymnasium.

Qualification

The qualification for 2008 Summer Olympics began from May 2007 until April 2008. During that period, all of tournaments sanctioned by the Badminton World Federation (except test events) awarded points to qualify for Olympic Games.

Competition schedule

Participating nations

Draw
The draw of the competition was held on July 26, 2008 in Beijing Henan Plaza Hotel at 16:00 CST (UTC+8). The draw was originally scheduled on August 4, 2008, just five days before the start of the competition. However it was brought forward to ensure better television broadcast scheduling.

Medal summary

Medal table
Retrieved from Beijing Olympics 2008 official website.

Medalists

Results

Men's singles

Women's singles

Men's doubles

Women's doubles

Mixed doubles

References

External links
Badminton – Official Results Book

 
2008 in badminton
2008 Summer Olympics events
2008
Badminton tournaments in China